The M27 also known as Jabu Ngcobo Drive or Old Inanda Road is a metropolitan route in the eThekwini Metropolitan Municipality, South Africa linking Inanda to Verulam and eMdloti, north of Durban.

Route 
The M27 begins at the intersection with the M25 (Mafukuzela Highway; to Inanda and KwaMashu) and Mazwezulu Road (to Osidisweni) just outside Inanda. It runs in an easterly direction towards the coast, traversing the sugarcane plantations and the rural areas of Buffelsdraai and Redcliffe before entering the town of Verulam.

The M27 intersects the R102 (Gopalall Hurbans Road; to oThongathi and Mount Edgecombe) south of Verulam's Central Business District (CBD). It then intersects with Ireland Street to turn right and continues to traverse through Verulam as well as the neighbouring township of Waterloo before travelling through sugarcane plantations again.

It intersects the N2 highway (to King Shaka International Airport, KwaDukuza and Durban) at the Exit 190 interchange before shortly intersecting the M4 highway (Leo Boyd Highway; to Ballito and uMhlanga). It then passes the Sibaya development before ending at the traffic circle with North/South Beach Road in eMdloti.

History
In 2008, it was proposed that the road be named after Jabu Ngcobo, who worked with the ANC. The eThekwiki Municipality assumed maintenance of the road from the KZN Department of Transport in 2017, following driver concerns that the road was not properly maintained. In 2019, there were more concerns expressed about the number of potholes on the road and the lack of response from the KZN Department of Transport. In 2021, a resident expressed concerns that streetlights on Jabu Ngcobo Road not working were contributing to crime in the area.

References 

Metropolitan Routes in Durban